Guy Moussi (born 23 January 1985) is a French former professional footballer who last played as a defensive midfielder. He spent several years with both Angers SCO and Nottingham Forest, and short spells with Millwall and Birmingham City. He ended his career after one season with Finnish club HJK Helsinki.

Career

Angers
Born in Bondy, Seine-Saint-Denis, Moussi began his career at Angers SCO. He spent six seasons, where he made 120 appearances, scoring two goals. On 30 June 2008, it was announced that Moussi had travelled to the City Ground to join Nottingham Forest.

Nottingham Forest
After joining Forest in the summer, Moussi made a confident start to his career in England, becoming a regular in the Forest midfield. However, due to injury, he missed a large portion of his debut English season. After recovering from an injury at the start of the 2009–10 season, Moussi scored his first goal for Nottingham Forest three minutes into added time in the 1–0 win over Barnsley at the City Ground on Tuesday 20 October. His over-enthusiastic celebration earned him a second yellow card, resulting in him being sent off.

On 19 July 2011, despite reports linking Moussi with moves to Everton, Wigan Athletic, Stoke City and West Bromwich Albion, he re-signed for Nottingham Forest on a three-year deal after his contract had run out on 30 June.

On 14 November 2013, Moussi signed on loan for Millwall until 2 January 2014. On 28 May 2014, it was announced Moussi would not be having his contract renewed.

Birmingham City
In November 2014, Moussi signed a two-month deal with Football League Championship club Birmingham City. Following his signing, he pledged to donate all his salary to four charities: the Birmingham City Disabled Supporters Club, Stop Ebola, a church in Paris and the TEV Soma Charity, which was raising money to help victims of the Soma mine disaster in Turkey. He made his debut as a second-half substitute in the Championship match at home to Reading on 13 December, with Birmingham already 6–1 ahead. He had little opportunity to force himself into a stable first team, and his contract was not extended, his final appearance coming at his former employers Nottingham Forest, where he received a good reception from the Forest fans.

HJK
On the transfer deadline day in February 2015, Moussi signed for Finnish club HJK Helsinki.

Career statistics

References

External links

1985 births
Living people
Sportspeople from Bondy
French footballers
Footballers from Seine-Saint-Denis
Association football midfielders
Ligue 2 players
English Football League players
Veikkausliiga players
Angers SCO players
Nottingham Forest F.C. players
Millwall F.C. players
Birmingham City F.C. players
Helsingin Jalkapalloklubi players
French expatriate footballers
French expatriate sportspeople in England
Expatriate footballers in England
French expatriate sportspeople in Finland
Expatriate footballers in Finland